The 2006 Recopa Sudamericana (officially the 2006 Recopa Visa Sudamericana for sponsorship reasons) was the 14th Recopa Sudamericana, an annual football match between the winners of the previous season's Copa Libertadores and Copa Sudamericana competitions. This edition was played under a two-legged series after several editions played in neutral venues.

The match was contested by São Paulo, winners of the 2005 Copa Libertadores, and defending champions Boca Juniors, winners of the 2005 Copa Sudamericana and appearing in their third consecutive final. As both teams have won the competition twice before, this edition determined who will become the first  of the Recopa Sudamericana. 

Boca Juniors successfully defend the title as they beat São Paulo 4–3 on aggregate to win their third Recopa trophy. The second leg was also the last match coached by Alfio Basile, who left the club. This victory also positioned Boca Juniors, momentarily, as the most lauded international club of the world.

Qualified teams

Venues

Matches

First leg

Second leg

References

2006 in South American football
2006
2006–07 in Argentine football
2006 in Brazilian football
Boca Juniors matches
São Paulo FC matches
2006